Romandy ( or ) is the French-speaking part of western Switzerland. In 2020, about 2 million people, or 22.8% of the Swiss population, lived in Romandy. The majority of the  population lives in the western part of the country, especially the  region along Lake Geneva, connecting Geneva, Vaud and the Lower Valais.

French is the sole official language in four Swiss cantons: Geneva, Vaud, Neuchâtel, and Jura. Additionally, French and German have co-official status in three cantons: Fribourg/Freiburg, Valais/Wallis, and Berne/Bern.

Name
"Roman"); in Old French used as a term for the Gallo-Romance vernaculars.

Simple  "western Switzerland" may also be used as a loose synonym.

Politics
"Romandy" is not an official territorial division of Switzerland any more than there is a clear linguistic boundary. For instance, substantial parts of the canton of Fribourg and the western canton of Bern are traditionally bilingual, most prominently in Seeland around the lakes of Morat, Neuchâtel and Bienne (Biel). French is the sole official language in four Swiss cantons: Geneva, Vaud, Neuchâtel, and Jura; and the co-official language – along with German – in the cantons of Valais, Bern, and Fribourg, French speakers forming the majority of the population in the regions of Lower Valais, Bernese Jura and Fribourg francophone ("French-speaking Fribourg"). Bernese Jura is an administrative division of the Canton of Bern, whereas the two others are informal denominations.

Geography 

"rösti ditch", adopted in Swiss French as ). The term is humorous in origin and refers both to the geographic division and to perceived cultural differences between the Romandy and the German-speaking Swiss majority. The term can be traced to the WWI period, but it entered mainstream usage in the 1970s in the context of the Jurassic separatism virulent at the time.

The linguistic boundary cuts across Switzerland north-to-south, forming the eastern boundary of the canton of Jura and then encompassing the Bernese Jura, where the boundary frays to include a number of bilingual communities, the largest of which is Biel/Bienne. It then follows the border between Neuchâtel and Bern and turns south towards Morat, again traversing an areal of traditional bilinguism including the communities of Morat and Fribourg. It divides the canton of Fribourg into a western French-speaking majority and an eastern German-speaking minority and then follows the eastern boundary of Vaud with the upper Saane/Sarine valley of the Bernese Oberland. Cutting across the High Alps at Les Diablerets, the boundary then separates the French-speaking Lower Valais from the Alemannic-speaking Upper Valais beyond Sierre. It then cuts southwards into the High Alps again, separating the Val d'Anniviers from the Mattertal.

Historically, the linguistic boundary in the Swiss Plateau would have more or less followed the Aare during the early medieval period, separating Burgundy (where the Burgundians did not impose their Germanic language on the Gallo-Roman population) from Alemannia; in the High Middle Ages, the boundary gradually shifted westward and now more or less corresponds to the western boundary of the Zähringer possessions, which fell under Bernese rule in the late medieval period, and does not follow any obvious topographical features. The Valais has a separate linguistic history; here, the entire valley, as far as it was settled, would have been Gallo-Roman speaking until its upper parts were settled by Highest Alemannic speakers entering from the Bernese Oberland in the high medieval period (see Walser).

Language

Traditionally speaking the Franco-Provençal or  dialects of Upper Burgundy, the  population now speak a variety of Standard French.

Today, the differences between Swiss French and Parisian French are minor and mostly lexical, although  remnants of dialectal lexicon or phonology may remain more pronounced in rural speakers. In particular, some parts of the Swiss Jura participate in the  dialect spoken in the  region of France.

Since the 1970s, there has been a limited amount of linguistic revivalism of Franco-Provençal dialects, which are often now called  (a 1980s neologism derived from the dialectal form of the word alpine) and their area Arpitania.

Cultural identity

Historically, most of the Romandy has been strongly Protestant, especially Calvinist; Geneva was one of the earliest and most important Calvinist centres. In recent decades, due to significant immigration from France and Southern European countries, Catholics can now be found throughout the region.

The Tour de Romandie is an annual cycling event on the UCI World Tour, often considered to be an important race in preparation for the Tour de France.

Library Network
The Library Network of Western Switzerland is in the region of Romandy.

It is a collection of Libraries of Western Switzerland that are based in the region of Romandy.

See also

 Languages of Switzerland
 Swiss French
 
 Jurassic separatism
 Bernese Jura
 Lake Geneva region
 Rhodanic Republic
 Arpitania

Notes

References

Bibliography
Charles-Ferdinand Ramuz, La Suisse romande, Sociétés coopératives Migros romandes, copyright Mme Olivieri-Ramuz, Lausanne, 1955.
Histoire de la littérature en Suisse romande, vol.4, Lausanne, 1996-1999, republished Geneva, 2015
Corinne Blanchaud, Dictionnaire des écrivains francophones classiques, Belgique, Canada, Québec, Luxembourg, Suisse romande, Paris, 2013
Académie de Genève Humbert, Nouveau glossaire genevois, Slatkine, 1983, .

Romandy
Subdivisions of Switzerland
Regions of Switzerland